Rough Side Out is an EP by Alan Doyle, released on February 14, 2020. It is his fourth studio release as a solo artist, and his first EP.

Commercial performance
The EP debuted at number two on the Billboard Canadian Albums chart. The lead single, "We Don't Wanna Go Home", a duet with Dean Brody, peaked at number 36 on the Canadian Digital Song Sales chart.

Track listing

Charts

References

2020 EPs
Alan Doyle albums